Feelin' You may refer to:

 "Feelin' You" (Solange Knowles song)
 "Feelin' You" (Bright song)
 "Feelin' You", non-album single by 3LW

See also
"Munch (Feelin' U)", a 2022 song by Ice Spice
"Feelin' U", a 2003 song by Shy FX